Farah Tufail is a Pakistani television actress and RJ. She started her career during 2000s. Tufail received Hum Award for Best Actress for her portrayal of Tehreem in telefilm Tehreem. Her television appearance includes a series of notable projects like Hum Tum Aur Woh (2008), Dil Ki Batain (2008), Thakan (2012), Teri Raah Main Rul Gai (2012), Kuch Pyar Ka Pagalpan (2014), Kaneez (2015), Baaghi (2017), Pinjra (2017), Ghughi (2018), Aakhri Station (2018), Hoor Pari (2019).

Television

References 

21st-century Pakistani actresses
Living people
Year of birth missing (living people)
Place of birth missing (living people)
Nationality missing
Pakistani television actresses
Actresses from Lahore